"Isn't He (This Jesus)" is a song performed by Nashville-based contemporary worship band The Belonging Co featuring American singer Natalie Grant, which was released on March 23, 2018, as the lead single from The Belonging Co's second live album, Awe + Wonder (2019). The song was written by Andrew Holt, Mia Fieldes, Natalie Grant, and Seth Mosley. The single was produced by Henry Seeley.

"Isn't He (This Jesus)" peaked at No. 27 on the US Hot Christian Songs chart.

Background
On March 23, 2018, The Belonging Co released "Isn't He (This Jesus)" featuring Natalie Grant as a single.

Composition

Commercial performance
"Isn't He (This Jesus)" debuted at No. 27 on the US Hot Christian Songs chart dated April 7, 2018, concurrently charting at No. 7 on the Christian Digital Song Sales chart. It spent a total of two weeks on Hot Christian Songs Chart.

Music video
On March 23, 2018, The Belonging Co released the official music video for "Isn't He (This Jesus)" featuring Natalie Grant leading the song live at The Belonging Co Conference in Nashville, Tennessee.

Charts

Release history

References

External links
 

2018 songs
2018 singles
Natalie Grant songs
Songs written by Mia Fieldes
Songs written by Seth Mosley